Maen Achwyfan Cross near the village of Whitford, Flintshire, Wales, is a high cross dating from the late 10th or early 11th century.

History and description
Cadw translates Maen Achwyfan as "the stone of [Saint] Cwyfan" and dates the cross to the early Medieval or Medieval periods. Edward Hubbard, in his Clwyd Pevsner, suggests a build date of the late 10th or early 11th century. It stands 3.4 m high and is carved from a single block of stone. Its height makes it the "tallest wheel cross in Britain". Its wheel cross head has bosses on both sides. The shaft is decorated with knotwork and with images of men and animals. Hubbard recorded in 2003 that the figurative images were "now barely discernible". Cadw notes the Viking influence on the design, the cross being carved at a time when Viking raids were common along the North Wales coastline.

The cross stands in a field to the north of the village of Whitford. It is a Scheduled monument.

See also 

 Archaeology of Wales
 Wales in the Middle Ages
 Carew Cross
 St Brynach Cross

References

Sources

External links
 Coflein site with images of the cross
 Articles on the cross by Prof. Howard Williams – The Offa's Dyke Collaboratory

Scheduled monuments in Flintshire
Celtic crosses
High crosses
Monumental crosses in the United Kingdom
Cadw
Welsh artefacts